Built to Perform is the second and last full-length album by American heavy metal band Phantom Blue. In contrast to the first album's glam metal sound, Built to Perform displays a more raw, heavy metal sound. It also features songwriting credits by all five of the band members plus former member Nicole Couch, who left prior to the album's release. The album includes the band's cover of Thin Lizzy's "Bad Reputation."

Veteran producer Max Norman oversaw the album's production, while Marty Friedman (who was then with Megadeth) and John Norum (of Europe) contributed as guest guitarists. Norum and guitarist Michelle Meldrum eventually married in 1995. "My Misery" was co-written by West Arkeen, known for his collaborations with Guns N' Roses.

Released by Geffen Records, this was the band's only album under a major record label.

Track listing

Personnel 
Phantom Blue
 Gigi Hangach – vocals
 Michelle Meldrum – guitars 
 Karen Kreutzer – guitar
 Kim Nielsen – bass guitar
 Linda McDonald – drums

Additional musicians
 Marty Friedman - guitar on "A Little Evil"
 John Norum - guitar on "Better Off Dead"
A.T Das - In studio additional guitar

Production
Max Norman - producer, engineer, mixing
George Marino - mastering

References 

1993 albums
Phantom Blue albums
Albums produced by Max Norman
Geffen Records albums
Roadrunner Records albums